Buganeh Razbashi (also Romanized as Būganeh Rāzbāshī; also known as Rāzbāshī) is a village in Beyranvand-e Shomali Rural District, Bayravand District, Khorramabad County, Lorestan Province, Iran. At the 2006 census, its population was 140, in 31 families.

References 

Towns and villages in Khorramabad County